Yuzhnoukrainsk is a city on the Southern Bug river, in Voznesensk Raion, Mykolaiv Oblast, Ukraine, about 350 kilometers (over 200 miles) south of the capital Kyiv. It hosts the administration of Yuzhnoukrainsk urban hromada, one of the hromadas of Ukraine. Population:

History 
Yuzhnoukrainsk was founded in 1976. It is one of the youngest Ukrainian towns.

Until 18 July 2020, Yuzhnoukrainsk was incorporated as a city of oblast significance. In July 2020, as part of the administrative reform of Ukraine, which reduced the number of raions of Mykolaiv Oblast to four, the city of Yuzhnoukrainsk was merged into Voznesensk Raion.

Had the Russian-held Mykolaiv Military–Civilian Administration pushed northwards capturing Nova Odesa and Voznesensk, Yuzhnoukrainsk will be the de jure capital of the oblast.

Industry
A dam and hydroelectric power station of the Tashlyk Pumped-Storage Power Plant is south of the city. 

South Ukraine Nuclear Power Plant, also known as Yuzhnoukrainsk Nuclear Power Plant, is on the opposite shore of the hydroelectric reservoir from the city. The power plant has three VVER-1000 reactors and a net capacity of 2,850 megawatts (MW). It is the second largest of the five nuclear power plants in the country.  During the 2022 Russian invasion of Ukraine, the nuclear power plant was close to being hit by Russian cruise missiles.

Famous people
Born
 Yelyzaveta Servatynska (* 1997) is a Ukrainian photojournalist.
 Lesia Tsurenko (* 1989) is a Ukrainian tennis player.

Gallery

References

External links

 Official site of Yuzhnoukrainsk
 Yuzhnoukrainsk free adboard

Cities in Mykolaiv Oblast
Populated places established in the Ukrainian Soviet Socialist Republic
Cities of regional significance in Ukraine
Company towns in Ukraine
Populated places on the Southern Bug
1976 establishments in Ukraine
Populated places established in 1976